Dundee is a city in Delaware County, Iowa, United States. The population was 198 at the time of the 2020 census.

Geography
Dundee is located at  (42.578842, -91.547116) along the Maquoketa River.

Dundee was established in 1887.

Demographics

2010 census
As of the census of 2010, there were 174 people, 79 households, and 40 families living in the city. The racial makeup of the city was 100.0% White. Hispanic or Latino of any race were 1.7% of the population.

There were 79 households, of which 29.1% had children under the age of 18 living with them, 39.2% were married couples living together, 3.8% had a female householder with no husband present, 7.6% had a male householder with no wife present, and 49.4% were non-families. 43.0% of all households were made up of individuals, and 20.3% had someone living alone who was 65 years of age or older. The average household size was 2.20 and the average family size was 3.00.

The median age in the city was 37.3 years. 25.3% of residents were under the age of 18; 5.1% were between the ages of 18 and 24; 28.7% were from 25 to 44; 19.6% were from 45 to 64; and 21.3% were 65 years of age or older. The gender makeup of the city was 52.9% male and 47.1% female.

2000 census
As of the census of 2000, there were 179 people, 80 households, and 54 families living in the city. The racial makeup of the city was 100.00% White.

There were 80 households, out of which 25.0% had children under the age of 18 living with them, 66.3% were married couples living together, and 32.5% were non-families. 28.8% of all households were made up of individuals, and 17.5% had someone living alone who was 65 years of age or older. The average household size was 2.24 and the average family size was 2.72.

In the city, the population was spread out, with 22.3% under the age of 18, 3.4% from 18 to 24, 26.8% from 25 to 44, 25.7% from 45 to 64, and 21.8% who were 65 years of age or older. The median age was 43 years. For every 100 females, there were 86.5 males. For every 100 females age 18 and over, there were 87.8 males.

The median income for a household in the city was $26,719, and the median income for a family was $30,000. Males had a median income of $25,625 versus $19,583 for females. The per capita income for the city was $13,531. About 8.3% of families and 9.8% of the population were below the poverty line, including 4.9% of those under the age of eighteen and 21.7% of those 65 or over.

Education
The West Delaware County Community School District operates local area public schools.

References

Cities in Iowa
Cities in Delaware County, Iowa
1887 establishments in Iowa